Elections to the Himachal Pradesh Legislative Assembly were held in February 1990 to elect members of 67 constituencies in Himachal Pradesh, India. The Bharatiya Janata Party won the popular vote and a majority of seats and its leader, Shanta Kumar was appointed as the Chief Minister of Himachal Pradesh for his second term. The number of constituencies was set as 68 by the recommendation of the Delimitation Commission of India.

Results

Elected members

See also
List of constituencies of the Assam Legislative Assembly
1990 elections in India

References

State Assembly elections in Himachal Pradesh
1990s in Himachal Pradesh
Himachal